A Flair for the Dramatic is the debut studio album by American rock band Pierce the Veil.

Background and recording
It was revealed in December 2006 that Before Today changed their name to Pierce the Veil, and that they had posted a few songs on their Myspace account.

It was produced by Casey Bates, along with Vic Fuentes, and was recorded with only the Fuentes brothers taking up all instrument duties.

Release
On May 3, 2007, it was announced that the band had signed to Equal Vision. A week later, the album's artwork and track listing was revealed. In early May, the band toured with Poison the Well, before touring with Portugal. The Man in mid May. Throughout the rest of May, and running into early June, the band toured with Alesana. A music video for "Currents Convulsive" was released on June 19. The album was released by Equal Vision on June 26. From late July to mid September, the band supported Scary Kids Scaring Kids and Boys Night Out on their co-headlining U.S. tour. In September and October, the band supported Chiodos on their I'm a Mathlete, Not an Athlete tour. In November and December, the band supported From First to Last on their headlining US tour.

The band supported Emery for their tour national tour around the U.S. from January 29 to March 22, 2008. In April, the band appeared at the Bamboozle Left festival. On May 2, a music video for "Yeah Boy and Doll Face" premiered on Fuse. The video was directed by Nate Weaver in Los Angeles. Between June and August, the band performed on the 2008 edition of Warped Tour. In October and November, the band went on a headlining US tour with support from Breathe Carolina, Four Letter Lie, and Emarosa. Between mid-February and early April 2009, the band participated in the 2009 edition of Taste of Chaos tours. A music video for "Chemical Kids and Mechanical Brides" was released on April 13.

Reception
It charted at number 61 on the Heatseekers Albums chart in the U.S.

Track listing 
All songs by Mike and Vic Fuentes, except where noted.

Bonus track

Personnel
Pierce the Veil
Vic Fuentes – lead vocals, guitars, bass guitars, keyboards, synthesizers, programming, piano
Mike Fuentes – drums, percussion, programming, backing vocals

Production
 Produced and mixed by Vic Fuentes and Casey Bates
 Engineered by Casey Bates and Nick Johnson
 Additional keyboard by Dave Yaden
 Photography by Kevin Knight and Jerad Knudson
 Art Direction by Vic Fuentes
 Design by Don Clark for Invisible Creature

Chart positions

References
 Footnotes

 Citations

External links

A Flair for the Dramatic at YouTube (streamed copy where licensed)

2007 albums
Pierce the Veil albums
Albums produced by Vic Fuentes
Equal Vision Records albums